Stepanavan Airport  is a civil airport serving the city of Stepanavan and the province of Lori, in the country of Armenia.

In 2014, reconstruction of the administrative buildings of "Stepanavan" Airport JSC and Kapan airport included replacing fencing and renovation of the runway of the airports. The Ministry of Emergency Situations of Armenia will use the airport to fight wildfires. Talks are currently underway with the Russian government about purchasing several fire-fighting aircraft; most probably Beriev Be-200 aircraft.

See also

 List of airports in Armenia
 List of the busiest airports in Armenia
 Transport in Armenia

References

External links
 General Department of Civil Aviation of Armenia – Airport Information 

Airports built in the Soviet Union
Airports in Armenia
Buildings and structures in Lori Province